Acer pictum, commonly known as yellow-paint maple, is an Asian species of maple. It widespread across much of China as well as Korea, Japan, Mongolia, and eastern Russia. Its natural habitat is in temperate forests.

Acer pictum is a deciduous tree up to 20 meters tall, with gray bark. Leaves are non-compound, thin, up to 12 cm wide and 12 cm across, toothless, with 3, 5, 7, or 9 lobes.

Taxonomy
Acer pictum is taxonomically complex species, showing morphological variation that corresponds to different geographic regions. Treatments of this variation have ranged from recognizing entities at the species level, to uniting them all under an undivided A. pictum. Further taxonomic study of this group is needed. Five subspecies are provisionally recognized in the Flora of China. These are:
Acer pictum subsp. macropterum - China
Acer pictum subsp. mono - China, Japan, Korea, Mongolia, and east Russia
Acer pictum subsp. pictum - Japan and Korea
Acer pictum subsp. pubigerum - China
Acer pictum subsp. tricuspis - China

References

External links
line drawing for Flora of China drawing 1 at top

pictum
Plants described in 1784
Flora of temperate Asia